Karl Ludwig Johann d'Ester (4 November 1813 – 18 June 1859) was a German physician by vocation and a democrat and socialist by philosophy.  Because of his beliefs, d'Ester joined the Cologne chapter of the Communist League.  In 1848, he was elected as a deputy to the Prussian National Assembly where he caucused with the Left-wing deputies of that assembly.  In October 1848, d'Ester became a member of the Central Committee of the German Democrats.  D'Ester played a prominent part in the Baden-Palatinate uprising in 1849.  Following the suppression of that uprisinge, d'Ester emigrated to Switzerland. He died in 1859.

References

1813 births
1859 deaths
German revolutionaries
German socialists
Physicians from Cologne
Politicians from Cologne
German emigrants to Switzerland
Member of the Prussian National Assembly